The genetic history of Africa is composed of the overall genetic history of African populations in Africa, including the regional genetic histories of North Africa, West Africa, East Africa, Central Africa, and Southern Africa, as well as the recent origin of modern humans in Africa. The Sahara served as a trans-regional passageway and place of dwelling for people in Africa during various humid phases and periods throughout the history of Africa.

Overview

The peoples of Africa are characterized by regional genetic substructure and heterogeneity, depending on the respective ethno-linguistic identity, and, in part, explainable by the "multiregional evolution" of modern human lineages in various multiple regions of the African continent, as well as later admixture events, including back-migrations from Eurasia, of both highly differentiated West- and East-Eurasian components.

Africans' genetic ancestry is largely partitioned by geography and language family, with populations belonging to the same ethno-linguistic groupings showing high genetic homogeneity and coherence. Gene flow, consistent with both short- and long-range migration events followed by extensive admixture and bottleneck events, have influenced the regional genetic makeup and demographic structure of Africans. The historical Bantu expansion had lasting impacts on the modern demographic make up of Africa, resulting in a greater genetic and linguistic homogenization. Genetic, archeologic, and linguistic studies added extra insight into this movement: "Our results reveal a genetic continuum of Niger–Congo speaker populations across the continent and extend our current understanding of the routes, timing and extent of the Bantu migration."

Overall, different African populations display genetic diversity and substructure, but can be clustered in distinct but partially overlapping groupings:

 Khoisan hunter-gatherer lineages from Southern Africa represent the deepest lineages, forming a divergent and distinct cluster, shifted away from contemporary "Sub-Saharan Africans", and are further diverged from them than the various Eurasian lineages are. The diverging date of these "Southern hunter-gatherers" from all other human populations is estimated to over 100,000 years ago respectively, with the Khoisan later diverging into two subgroups, northern and southern Khoisan,~30,000 years ago.
 Rain forest foragers such as the Baka and the Mbuti diverged from other Sub-Saharan African groups over 60,000 years ago. Eastern groups such as the Mbuti split from Western groups such as the Baka ~20,000 years ago.
 The various Afroasiatic speakers are suggested to have diverged from other African groups ~50,000 years ago.
 Niger-Congo and Nilo-Saharan speakers split around 28,000 years ago.
 Austronesian-speaking Malagasy people in Madagascar have received significant East/Southeast Asian admixture, less among some groups of coastal Southern, Eastern and the Horn of Africa. The estimated date of geneflow is 2,200 years ago.

Indigenous Africans

The indigenous populations of Africa consists of Niger–Congo speakers, Nilo-Saharan speakers, the divergent and diverse Khoisan grouping, as well as of several unclassified or isolated ethnolinguistic groupings (see unclassified languages of Africa). The origin of the Afroasiatic languages remains disputed, with some proposing a Middle Eastern origin, while others support an African origin with varying degrees of Eurasian and African components. The Austronesian languages originated in southern East Asia, and later expanded outgoing from the Philippines.

The Niger–Congo languages probably originated in or near the area where these languages were spoken prior to Bantu expansion (i.e. West Africa or Central Africa). Its expansion may have been associated with the expansion of agriculture, during in the African Neolithic period, following the desiccation of the Sahara in c. 3500 BCE. Proto-Niger-Congo may have originated about 10,000 years before present in the "Green Sahara" of Africa (roughly the Sahel and southern Sahara), and that its dispersal can be correlated with the spread of the bow and arrow by migrating hunter-gatherers, which later developed agriculture.

Although the validity of the Nilo-Saharan family remains controversial, the region between Chad, Sudan, and the Central African Republic is seen as a likely candidate for its homeland prior to its dispersal around 10,000–8,000 BCE.

The Southern African hunter-gatherers (Khoisan) are suggested to represent the autochthonous hunter-gatherer population of southern Africa, prior to the expansion of Bantu-speakers from Western/Central Africa and East African pastoralists. Khoisan show evidence for Bantu-related admixture, ranging from nearly ~0% to up to ~87.1%.

Out-of-Africa event

The "recent African origin of modern humans" model proposes a "single origin" of Homo sapiens in Africa the taxonomic sense. Recent genetic and archeologic data suggests that Homo sapiens-subgroups originated in multiple regions of Africa, not confined to a single region of origin. The H. sapiens ancestral to proper Eurasians most likely left Northeastern Africa between 50,000 and 100,000 years ago. The "recent African origin" model proposes that all modern non-African populations descend from one or several waves of H. sapiens that left Africa 70,000-60,000 years ago.

According to Durvasula et al. (2020), there are indications that 2% to 19% (≃6.6 to 7.0%) of the DNA of West African populations may have come from an unknown archaic hominin which split from the ancestor of humans and Neanderthals between 360 kya to 1.02 mya. However, the study also suggests that at least part of this archaic admixture is also present in Eurasians/non-Africans, and that the admixture event or events range from 0 to 124 ka B.P, which includes the period before the Out-of-Africa migration and prior to the African/Eurasian split (thus affecting in part the common ancestors of both Africans and Eurasians/non-Africans). Chen et al. (2020) found that Africans have higher Neanderthal ancestry than previously thought. 2,504 African samples from all over Africa were analyzed and tested on Neanderthal ancestry. All African samples showed evidence for minor Neanderthal ancestry, but always at lower levels than observed in Eurasians.

Geneflow between Eurasian and African populations

Significant Eurasian admixture is found in Northern Africa, and among specific ethnic groups of the Horn of Africa, as well as among the Malagasy people of Madagascar. Various genome studies found evidence for multiple prehistoric back-migrations from various Eurasian populations and subsequent admixture with native groups. West-Eurasian geneflow arrived to Northern Africa during the Paleolithic (30,000 to 15,000 years ago), followed by other pre-Neolithic and Neolithic migration events. Genetic data on the Taforalt samples "demonstrated that Northern Africa received significant amounts of gene-flow from Eurasia predating the Holocene and development of farming practices". Medieval geneflow events, such as the Arab expansion also left traces in various African populations. Pickrell et al. (2014) indicated that Western Eurasian ancestry eventually arrived through Northeast Africa (particularly the Horn of Africa) to Southern Africa.

Ramsay et al. (2018) also found evidence for significant Western Eurasian admixture in various parts of Africa, from both ancient and more recent migrations, being highest among populations from Northern Africa, and some groups of the Horn of Africa:

In addition to the intrinsic diversity within the continent due to population structure and isolation, migration of Eurasian populations into Africa has emerged as a critical contributor to the genetic diversity. These migrations involved the influx of different Eurasian populations at different times and to different parts of Africa. Comprehensive characterization of the details of these migrations through genetic studies on existing populations could help to explain the strong genetic differences between some geographically neighbouring populations.

This distinctive Eurasian admixture appears to have occurred over at least three time periods with ancient admixture in central west Africa (e.g., Yoruba from Nigeria) occurring between ~7.5 and 10.5 kya, older admixture in east Africa (e.g., Ethiopia) occurring between ~2.4 and 3.2 kya and more recent admixture between ~0.15 and 1.5 kya in some east African (e.g., Kenyan) populations.

Subsequent studies based on LD decay and haplotype sharing in an extensive set of African and Eurasian populations confirmed the presence of Eurasian signatures in west, east and southern Africans. In the west, in addition to Niger-Congo speakers from The Gambia and Mali, the Mossi from Burkina Faso showed the oldest Eurasian admixture event ~7 kya. In the east, these analyses inferred Eurasian admixture within the last 4000 years in Kenya.

There is no definitive agreement on when or where the original homeland of the Afroasiatic language family existed. Some have suggested that they were spread by people with largely West-Eurasian ancestry during the Neolithic Revolution, towards Northern Africa and the Horn of Africa, outgoing from the Middle East, specifically from the Levant. This hypothesis does not account for the domestication of plants endemic to the Horn of Africa such as teff, ensete, and niger seed, nor does it account for the lack of evidence of intrusive agricultural populations or the cultivation of wheat, barley, or sorghum in that region prior to 3000 B.C. Others argue that the first speakers of Afroasiatic (Proto-Afroasiatic) were based in Northeast Africa because that region includes the majority of the diversity of the Afroasiatic language family and has very diverse groups in close geographic proximity, sometimes considered a telltale sign for a linguistic geographic origin. A subset of the Proto-Afroasiatic population would have migrated to the Levant during the late Paleolithic, merging with local West-Eurasians and resulting in a population which would later give rise to Natufian culture, associated with the early development of agriculture and early Afroasiatic languages, or specifically pre-proto-Semitic.

While many studies conducted on Horn of Africa populations estimate a West-Eurasian admixture event around 3,000 years ago, Hodgson et al. (2014) found a distinct West-Eurasian ancestral component among studied Afroasiatic-speaking groups in the Horn of Africa (and to a lesser extent in North Africa and West Asia), most prevalent among the Somali. This ancestral component — dubbed "Ethio-Somali" — would have diverged from other non-African ancestries around 23,000 years ago and migrated back to Africa prior to developing agriculture, merging with the local indigenous lineages of the Horn of Africa. The authors propose that "Ethio-Somali" may have been a substantial ancestral component of the Proto-Afroasiatic-speaking population. A subsequent mtDNA analysis by Gandini et al. (2016) has produced additional evidence in support of a pre-agricultural back-migration from West-Eurasia into the Horn of Africa with an estimated date of arrival into the Horn of Africa in the early Holocene, possibly as a result of obsidian exchange networks across the Red Sea. Hodgson et al. also confirmed the existence of an ancestral component indigenous to the Horn of Africa –  "Ethiopic" (Hodgson et al.) or "Omotic" (Pagani et al.) – which is most prevalent among speakers of the Omotic branch of Afroasiatic in southwestern Ethiopia. This lineage is associated with that of a 4,500 year-old fossil (Mota) found in a cave in southwestern Ethiopia, which has high genetic affinity to modern Ethiopian groups, especially the endogamous blacksmith caste of the Omotic Aari people. Like Mota, Aari blacksmiths do not show evidence for admixture with West-Eurasians, demonstrating a degree of population continuity in this region for at least 4,500 years. In a comparative analysis of Mota’s genome referencing modern populations, Gallego et al. (2016) concluded that the divergence of Omotic from other Afroasiatic languages may have resulted from the relative isolation of its speakers from external groups. In an analysis of 68 Ethiopian ethnic groups, also referencing Mota, Lopez et al. (2021) revealed that groups belonging to the Omotic, Cushitic, and Semitic branches of Afro-Asiatic show high genetic similarity to each other on average. The data also support widespread recent intermixing among ethnic groups. Linguist Roger Blench proposed southwestern Ethiopia as the most likely homeland of Afroasiatic, due in part to the high internal diversification of the Omotic branch spoken in that region. In addition, Y-haplogroup sub-lineage E-M215 (also known as "E1b1b) and its derivative E-M35 are quite common among Afroasiatic speakers and southwestern Ethiopia is a plausible source of these haplogroups. The linguistic group and carriers of this lineage have a high probability to have arisen and dispersed together from Northeast Africa in the Mesolithic, plausibly having already developed subsistence patterns of pastoralism and intensive plant usage and collection. According to historian and linguist Christopher Ehret, the form of intensive plant collection practiced by the Proto-Afroasiatic population in Northeast Africa may have been a precursor to the agricultural practices that would later independently develop in the Fertile Crescent and the Horn of Africa. A 2018 re-analysis of autosomal DNA using modern populations as a reference found that the ancient Natufian samples of the Levant harbored 6.8% Omotic-related ancestry. Dobon et al. (2015) identified an autosomal ancestral component that is commonly found among modern Afroasiatic-speaking populations (as well as Nubians) in Northeast Africa. This component, which peaks among Copts in Sudan but is not found in Egyptians or Qataris, appears alongside a component that defines Nilo-Saharan speakers of southwestern Sudan and South Sudan. Arauna et al. (2017), analyzing existing genetic data obtained from Northern African populations, such as Berbers, described them as a mosaic of Middle Eastern, European, and Sub-Saharan African-related ancestries.

Specific East Asian-related ancestry is found among the Malagasy speakers of Madagascar at a medium frequency. The presence of this East Asian-related ancestry is mostly linked to the Austronesian peoples expansion from Southeast Asia. The peoples of Borneo were identified to resemble the East Asian voyagers, who arrived on Madagascar. East Asian ancestry among Malagasy people was estimated at a mean average of 33%, but as high as ~75% among some Highlander groups and upper caste groups.

Chen et al. (2020) analyzed 2,504 African samples from all over Africa, and found archaic Neanderthal ancestry, among all tested African samples at low frequency. They also identified a European-related (West-Eurasian) ancestry segment, which seems to largely correspond with the detected Neanderthal ancestry components. European-related admixture among Africans was estimated to be between ~0% to up to ~30%, with a peak among Northern Africans. According to Chen et al. (2020), "These data are consistent with the hypothesis that back-migration contributed to the signal of Neanderthal ancestry in Africans. Furthermore, the data indicates that this back-migration came after the split of Europeans and East Asians, from a population related to the European lineage."

Hollfelder et al. (2021) concluded that West African Yoruba people, which were previously used as "unadmixed reference population" for indigenous Africans, harbor minor levels of Neanderthal ancestry, which can be largely associated with back-migration of an "Ancestral European-like" source population.

Multiple studies found also evidence for geneflow of indigenous African ancestry towards Eurasia, specifically Europe and the Middle East. The analysis of 40 different West-Eurasian populations found African admixture at a frequency of 0% to up to ~15%.

There is a minor geneflow from North Africa in parts of Southern Europe, this is supported by the presence of an African-specific mitochondrial haplogroup among one of four 4,000 year old samples.

Regional genomic overview

North Africa

Archaic Human DNA

While Denisovan and Neanderthal ancestry in non-Africans outside of Africa are more certain, archaic human ancestry in Africans is less certain and is too early to be established with certainty.

Ancient DNA

An early medieval sample from the 5th to 6th century CE found in northern France (Angers) was found to be similar to present-day North Africans.

Egypt

Khnum-aa, Khnum-Nakht, Nakht-Ankh and JK2911 carried maternal haplogroup M1a1.

Djehutynakht (10A) carried maternal haplogroup U5b2b5. JK2888 carried maternal haplogroup U6a2.

Thuya, Tiye, Tutankhamen's mother, and Tutankhamen carried the maternal haplogroup K.

JK2134 carried maternal haplogroup J1d and JK2887 carried maternal haplogroup J2a1a1.

Amenhotep III, Akhenaten, and Tutankhamen carried the paternal haplogroup R1b.

Ramesses III and "Unknown Man E", possibly Pentawere, carried paternal haplogroup E1b1a.

JK2134 and JK2911 carried paternal haplogroup J.

Takabuti carried maternal haplogroup H4a1 and YM:KMM A 63 carried maternal haplogroup HV.

OM:KMM A 64 carried maternal haplogroup T2c1a.

JK2888 carried paternal haplogroup E1b1b1a1b2.

Libya

At Takarkori rockshelter, in Libya, two naturally mummified women, dated to the Middle Pastoral Period (7000 BP), carried basal maternal haplogroup N.

Morocco

Van de Loorsdrecht et al. (2018)  found that of seven samples of Taforalts of Morocco, radiocarbon dated to between 15,100 cal BP and 13,900 cal BP, six were found to carry maternal haplogroup U6a, and one was found to carry maternal haplogroup M1b. Six of six males were found to carry paternal haplogroup E1b1b. They were found to harbor 63.5% Natufian-related ancestry and 36.5% Sub-Saharan African-related ancestry. The Sub-Saharan component is most strongly drawn out by modern West African groups such as the Yoruba and the Mende. The samples also contain an additional affinity to South, Central, and East African outgroups that cannot be explained by any known ancient or modern populations. When projected onto a principal component analysis graph of African and west Eurasian populations, the Taforalt individuals form a distinct cluster in an intermediate position between present-day North Africans [e.g., Amazighes (Berbers), Mozabites, and Saharawis] and East Africans (e.g., Afars, Oromos, and Somalis). Jeong (2020), comparing the Taforalt people of the Iberomaurusian culture to modern populations, found that the Taforalt's Sub-Saharan African genetic component may be best represented by modern West Africans (e.g., Yoruba).

Y-Chromosomal DNA

Mitochondrial DNA

Amid the Holocene, including the Holocene Climate Optimum in 8000 BP, Africans bearing haplogroup L2 spread within West Africa and Africans bearing haplogroup L3 spread within East Africa. As the largest migration since the Out of Africa migration, migration from Sub-Saharan Africa toward the North Africa occurred, by West Africans, Central Africans, and East Africans, resulting in migrations into Europe and Asia; consequently, Sub-Saharan African mitochondrial DNA was introduced into Europe and Asia. During the early period of the Holocene, 50% of Sub-Saharan African mitochondrial DNA was introduced into North Africa by West Africans and the other 50% was introduced by East Africans. During the modern period, a greater number of West Africans introduced Sub-Saharan African mitochondrial DNA into North Africa than East Africans.

Mitochondrial haplogroups L3, M, and N are found among Sudanese peoples (e.g., Beja, Nilotics, Nuba, Nubians), who have no known interaction (e.g., history of migration/admixture) with Europeans or Asians; rather than having developed in a post-Out-of-Africa migration context, mitochondrial macrohaplogroup L3/M/N and its subsequent development into distinct mitochondrial haplogroups (e.g., Haplogroup L3, Haplogroup M, Haplogroup N) may have occurred in East Africa at a time that considerably predates the Out-of-Africa migration event of 50,000 BP.

Autosomal DNA

Medical DNA

Lactase Persistence

Neolithic agriculturalists, who may have resided in Northeast Africa and the Near East, may have been the source population for lactase persistence variants, including –13910*T, and may have been subsequently supplanted by later migrations of peoples. The Sub-Saharan West African Fulani, the North African Tuareg, and European agriculturalists, who are descendants of these Neolithic agriculturalists, share the lactase persistence variant –13910*T. While shared by Fulani and Tuareg herders, compared to the Tuareg variant, the Fulani variant of –13910*T has undergone a longer period of haplotype differentiation. The Fulani lactase persistence variant –13910*T may have spread, along with cattle pastoralism, between 9686 BP and 7534 BP, possibly around 8500 BP; corroborating this timeframe for the Fulani, by at least 7500 BP, there is evidence of herders engaging in the act of milking in the Central Sahara.

West Africa

Archaic Human DNA

Archaic traits found in human fossils of West Africa (e.g., Iho Eleru fossils, which dates to 13,000 BP) and Central Africa (e.g., Ishango fossils, which dates between 25,000 BP and 20,000 BP) may have developed as a result of admixture between archaic humans and modern humans or may be evidence of late-persisting early modern humans. While Denisovan and Neanderthal ancestry in non-Africans outside of Africa are more certain, archaic human ancestry in Africans is less certain and is too early to be established with certainty.

Ancient DNA

As of 2017, human ancient DNA has not been found in the region of Western Africa. As of 2020, human ancient DNA has not been forthcoming in the region of Western Africa.

In 4000 BP, there may have been a population that traversed from Africa (e.g., West Africa or West-Central Africa), through the Strait of Gibraltar, into the Iberian peninsula, where admixing between Africans and Iberians (e.g., of northern Portugal, of southern Spain) occurred.

In Granada, a Muslim (Moor) of the Cordoba Caliphate, who was of haplogroups E1b1a1 and H1+16189, as well as estimated to date between 900 CE and 1000 CE, and a Morisco, who was of haplogroup L2e1, as well as estimated to date between 1500 CE and 1600 CE, were both found to be of Sub-Saharan West African (i.e., Gambian) and Iberian descent.

Y-Chromosomal DNA

As a result of haplogroup D0, a basal branch of haplogroup DE, being found in three Nigerian men, it may be the case that haplogroup DE, as well as its sublineages D0 and E, originated in Africa.

As of 19,000 years ago, Africans, bearing haplogroup E1b1a-V38, likely traversed across the Sahara, from east to west. E1b1a1-M2 likely originated in West Africa or Central Africa.

Mitochondrial DNA

Between 75,000 BP and 60,000 BP, Africans bearing haplogroup L3 emerged in East Africa and eventually migrated into and became present in modern West Africans, Central Africans, and non-Africans. Amid the Holocene, including the Holocene Climate Optimum in 8000 BP, Africans bearing haplogroup L2 spread within West Africa and Africans bearing haplogroup L3 spread within East Africa. As the largest migration since the Out of Africa migration, migration from Sub-Saharan Africa toward the North Africa occurred, by West Africans, Central Africans, and East Africans, resulting in migrations into Europe and Asia; consequently, Sub-Saharan African mitochondrial DNA was introduced into Europe and Asia. During the early period of the Holocene, 50% of Sub-Saharan African mitochondrial DNA was introduced into North Africa by West Africans and the other 50% was introduced by East Africans. During the modern period, a greater number of West Africans introduced Sub-Saharan African mitochondrial DNA into North Africa than East Africans. Between 15,000 BP and 7000 BP, 86% of Sub-Saharan African mitochondrial DNA was introduced into Southwest Asia by East Africans, largely in the region of Arabia, which constitute 50% of Sub-Saharan African mitochondrial DNA in modern Southwest Asia. In the modern period, 68% of Sub-Saharan African mitochondrial DNA was introduced by East Africans and 22% was introduced by West Africans, which constitutes 50% of Sub-Saharan African mitochondrial DNA in modern Southwest Asia. During the early period of the Holocene, Sub-Saharan African mitochondrial DNA was introduced into Europe, mostly in Iberia. West Africans probably migrated, across Sahelian Africa, North Africa, and the Strait of Gibraltar, into Europe, and introduced 63% of Sub-Saharan African mitochondrial DNA. During the modern period, West Africans introduced 75% of Sub-Saharan African mitochondrial DNA into Iberia and other parts of Europe, possibly by sea voyage.

Around 18,000 BP, Mende people, along with Gambian peoples, grew in population size.

In 15,000 BP, Niger-Congo speakers may have migrated from the Sahelian region of West Africa, along the Senegal River, and introduced L2a1 into North Africa, resulting in modern Mauritanian peoples and Berbers of Tunisia inheriting it.

Between 11,000 BP and 10,000 BP, Yoruba people and Esan people grew in population size.

As early as 11,000 years ago, Sub-Saharan West Africans, bearing macrohaplogroup L (e.g., L1b1a11, L1b1a6a, L1b1a8, L1b1a9a1, L2a1k, L3d1b1a), may have migrated through North Africa and into Europe, mostly into southern Europe (e.g., Iberia).

Autosomal DNA

Between 2000 BP and 1500 BP, Nilo-Saharan-speakers may have migrated across the Sahel, from East Africa into West Africa, and admixed with Niger-Congo-speaking Berom people.

A 2019 study on Fulani people by Fan et al., found that the Fulani show genetic affinity to isolated Afroasiatic-speaking groups in Eastern Africa, specifically Omotic-speakers such as the Aari people. While the Fulani have nearly exclusive indigenous African ancestry (defined by West and East African ancestry), they also show traces of West-Eurasian-like admixture, supporting an ancestral homeland somewhere in North or Eastern Africa, and westwards expansion during the Neolithic, possibly caused by the arrival and expansion of West-Eurasian-related groups.

Medical DNA

Sickle Cell

Amid the Green Sahara, the mutation for sickle cell originated in the Sahara or in the northwest forest region of western Central Africa (e.g., Cameroon) by at least 7,300 years ago, though possibly as early as 22,000 years ago. The ancestral sickle cell haplotype to modern haplotypes (e.g., Cameroon/Central African Republic and Benin/Senegal haplotypes) may have first arose in the ancestors of modern West Africans, bearing haplogroups E1b1a1-L485 and E1b1a1-U175 or their ancestral haplogroup E1b1a1-M4732. West Africans (e.g., Yoruba and Esan of Nigeria), bearing the Benin sickle cell haplotype, may have migrated through the northeastern region of Africa into the western region of Arabia. West Africans (e.g., Mende of Sierra Leone), bearing the Senegal sickle cell haplotype, may have migrated into Mauritania (77% modern rate of occurrence) and Senegal (100%); they may also have migrated across the Sahara, into North Africa, and from North Africa, into Southern Europe, Turkey, and a region near northern Iraq and southern Turkey. Some may have migrated into and introduced the Senegal and Benin sickle cell haplotypes into Basra, Iraq, where both occur equally. West Africans, bearing the Benin sickle cell haplotype, may have migrated into the northern region of Iraq (69.5%), Jordan (80%), Lebanon (73%), Oman (52.1%), and Egypt (80.8%).

Schistosomes

According to Steverding (2020), while not definite: Near the African Great Lakes, schistosomes (e.g., S. mansoni, S. haematobium) underwent evolution. Subsequently, there was an expansion alongside the Nile. From Egypt, the presence of schistosomes may have expanded, via migratory Yoruba people, into Western Africa. Thereafter, schistosomes may have expanded, via migratory Bantu peoples, into the rest of Sub-Saharan Africa (e.g., Southern Africa, Central Africa).

Thalassemia

Through pathways taken by caravans, or via travel amid the Almovarid period, a population (e.g., Sub-Saharan West Africans) may have introduced the –29 (A → G) β-thalassemia mutation (found in notable amounts among African-Americans) into the North African region of Morocco.

Central Africa

Archaic Human DNA

Archaic traits found in human fossils of West Africa (e.g., Iho Eleru fossils, which dates to 13,000 BP) and Central Africa (e.g., Ishango fossils, which dates between 25,000 BP and 20,000 BP) may have developed as a result of admixture between archaic humans and modern humans or may be evidence of late-persisting early modern humans. While Denisovan and Neanderthal ancestry in non-Africans outside of Africa are more certain, archaic human ancestry in Africans is less certain and is too early to be established with certainty.

Ancient DNA

In 4000 BP, there may have been a population that traversed from Africa (e.g., West Africa or West-Central Africa), through the Strait of Gibraltar, into the Iberian peninsula, where admixing between Africans and Iberians (e.g., of northern Portugal, of southern Spain) occurred.

Cameroon

West African hunter-gatherers, in the region of western Central Africa (e.g., Shum Laka, Cameroon), particularly between 8000 BP and 3000 BP, were found to be related to modern Central African hunter-gatherers (e.g., Baka, Bakola, Biaka, Bedzan).

Democratic Republic of Congo

At Kindoki, in the Democratic Republic of Congo, there were three individuals, dated to the protohistoric period (230 BP, 150 BP, 230 BP); one carried haplogroups E1b1a1a1d1a2 (E-CTS99, E-CTS99) and L1c3a1b, another carried haplogroup E (E-M96, E-PF1620), and the last carried haplogroups R1b1 (R-P25 1, R-M415) and L0a1b1a1.

At Ngongo Mbata, in the Democratic Republic of Congo, an individual, dated to the protohistoric period (220 BP), carried haplogroup L1c3a.

At Matangai Turu Northwest, in the Democratic Republic of Congo, an individual, dated to the Iron Age (750 BP), carried an undetermined haplogroup(s).

Y-Chromosomal DNA

Haplogroup R-V88 may have originated in western Central Africa (e.g., Equatorial Guinea), and, in the middle of the Holocene, arrived in North Africa through population migration.

Mitochondrial DNA

In 150,000 BP, Africans (e.g., Central Africans, East Africans) bearing haplogroup L1 diverged. Between 75,000 BP and 60,000 BP, Africans bearing haplogroup L3 emerged in East Africa and eventually migrated into and became present in modern West Africans, Central Africans, and non-Africans. Amid the Holocene, including the Holocene Climate Optimum in 8000 BP, Africans bearing haplogroup L2 spread within West Africa and Africans bearing haplogroup L3 spread within East Africa. As the largest migration since the Out of Africa migration, migration from Sub-Saharan Africa toward the North Africa occurred, by West Africans, Central Africans, and East Africans, resulting in migrations into Europe and Asia; consequently, Sub-Saharan African mitochondrial DNA was introduced into Europe and Asia.

Mitochondrial haplogroup L1c is strongly associated with pygmies, especially with Bambenga groups. L1c prevalence was variously reported as: 100% in Ba-Kola, 97% in Aka (Ba-Benzélé), and 77% in Biaka, 100% of the Bedzan (Tikar), 97% and 100% in the Baka people of Gabon and Cameroon, respectively, 97% in Bakoya (97%), and 82% in Ba-Bongo. Mitochondrial haplogroups L2a and L0a are prevalent among the Bambuti.

Autosomal DNA

Genetically, African pygmies have some key difference between them and Bantu peoples.

Medical DNA

Evidence suggests that, when compared to other Sub-Saharan African populations, African pygmy populations display unusually low levels of expression of the genes encoding for human growth hormone and its receptor associated with low serum levels of insulin-like growth factor-1 and short stature.

Eastern Africa

Archaic Human DNA

While Denisovan and Neanderthal ancestry in non-Africans outside of Africa are more certain, archaic human ancestry in Africans is less certain and is too early to be established with certainty.

Ancient DNA

Ethiopia

At Mota, in Ethiopia, an individual, estimated to date to the 5th millennium BP, carried haplogroups E1b1 and L3x2a. The individual of Mota is genetically related to groups residing near the region of Mota, and in particular, are considerably genetically related to the Aari people, especially the blacksmith caste of that group.

Kenya

At Jawuoyo Rockshelter, in Kisumu County, Kenya, a forager of the Later Stone Age carried haplogroups E1b1b1a1b2/E-V22 and L4b2a2c.

At Ol Kalou, in Nyandarua County, Kenya, a pastoralist of the Pastoral Neolithic carried haplogroups E1b1b1b2b2a1/E-M293 and L3d1d.

At Kokurmatakore, in Marsabit County, Kenya, a pastoralist of the Pastoral Iron Age carried haplogroups E1b1b1/E-M35 and L3a2a.

At White Rock Point, in Homa Bay County, Kenya, there were two foragers of the Later Stone Age; one carried haplogroups BT (xCT), likely B, and L2a4, and another probably carried haplogroup L0a2.

At Nyarindi Rockshelter, in Kenya, there were two individuals, dated to the Later Stone Age (3500 BP); one carried haplogroup L4b2a and another carried haplogroup E (E-M96, E-P162).

At Lukenya Hill, in Kenya, there were two individuals, dated to the Pastoral Neolithic (3500 BP); one carried haplogroups E1b1b1b2b (E-M293, E-CTS10880) and L4b2a2b, and another carried haplogroup L0f1.

At Hyrax Hill, in Kenya, an individual, dated to the Pastoral Neolithic (2300 BP), carried haplogroups E1b1b1b2b (E-M293, E-M293) and L5a1b.

At Molo Cave, in Kenya, there were two individuals, dated to the Pastoral Neolithic (1500 BP); while one had haplogroups that went undetermined, another carried haplogroups E1b1b1b2b (E-M293, E-M293) and L3h1a2a1.

At Kakapel, in Kenya, there were three individuals, one dated to the Later Stone Age (3900 BP) and two dated to the Later Iron Age (300 BP, 900 BP); one carried haplogroups CT (CT-M168, CT-M5695) and L3i1, another carried haplogroup L2a1f, and the last carried haplogroup L2a5.

At Panga ya Saidi, in Kenya, an individual, estimated to date between 496 BP and 322 BP, carried haplogroups E1b1b1b2 and L4b2a2.

Laikipia County

At Kisima Farm/Porcupine Cave, in Laikipia County, Kenya, there were two pastoralists of the Pastoral Neolithic; one carried haplogroups E1b1b1b2b2a1/E-M293 and M1a1, and another carried haplogroup M1a1f.

At Kisima Farm/C4, in Laikipia County, Kenya, a pastoralist of the Pastoral Iron Age, carried haplogroups E2 (xE2b)/E-M75 and L3h1a1.

At Laikipia District Burial, in Laikipia County, Kenya, a pastoralist of the Pastoral Iron Age carried haplogroup L0a1c1.

Nakuru County

At Prettejohn's Gully, in Nakuru County, Kenya, there were two pastoralists of the early pastoral period; one carried haplogroups E2 (xE2b)/E-M75 and K1a, and another carried haplogroup L3f1b.

At Cole's Burial, in Nakuru County, Kenya, a pastoralist of the Pastoral Neolithic carried haplogroups E1b1b1a1a1b1/E-CTS3282 and L3i2.

At Rigo Cave, in Nakuru County, Kenya, there were three pastoralists of the Pastoral Neolithic/Elmenteitan, one carried haplogroups E1b1b1b2b2a1/E-M293 and L3f, another carried haplogroups E1b1b1b2b2/E-V1486, likely E-M293, and probably M1a1b, and the last carried haplogroups E1b1b1b2b2a1/E-M293 and L4b2a2c.

At Naishi Rockshelter, in Nakuru County, Kenya, there two pastoralists of the Pastoral Neolithic; one carried haplogroups E1b1b1b2b/E-V1515, likely E-M293, and L3x1a, and another carried haplogroups A1b (xA1b1b2a)/A-P108 and L0a2d.

At Keringet Cave, in Nakuru County, Kenya, a pastoralist of the Pastoral Neolithic carried haplogroups A1b1b2/A-L427 and L4b2a1, and another pastoralist of the Pastoral Neolithic/Elmenteitan carried haplogroup K1a.

At Naivasha Burial Site, in Nakuru County, Kenya, there were five pastoralists of the Pastoral Neolithic; one carried haplogroup L4b2a2b, another carried haplogroups xBT, likely A, and M1a1b, another carried haplogroups E1b1b1b2b2a1/E-M293 and L3h1a1, another carried haplogroups A1b1b2b/A-M13 and L4a1, and the last carried haplogroups E1b1b1b2b2a1/E-M293 and L3x1a.

At Njoro River Cave II, in Nakuru County, Kenya, a pastoralist of the Pastoral Neolithic carried haplogroup L3h1a2a1.

At Egerton Cave, in Nakuru County, Kenya, a pastoralist of the Pastoral Neolithic/Elmenteitan carried haplogroup L0a1d.

At Ilkek Mounds, in Nakuru County, Kenya, a pastoralist of the Pastoral Iron Age carried haplogroups E2 (xE2b)/E-M75 and L0f2a.

At Deloraine Farm, in Nakuru County, Kenya, an iron metallurgist of the Iron Age carried haplogroups E1b1a1a1a1a/E-M58 and L5b1.

Narok County

At Kasiole 2, in Narok County, Kenya, a pastoralist of the Pastoral Iron Age carried haplogroups E1b1b1b2b/E-V1515, likely E-M293, and L3h1a2a1.

At Emurua Ole Polos, in Narok County, Kenya, a pastoralist of the Pastoral Iron Age carried haplogroups E1b1b1b2b2a1/E-M293 and L3h1a2a1.

Tanzania

At Mlambalasi rockshelter, in Tanzania, an individual, dated between 20,345 BP and 17,025 BP, carried undetermined haplogroups.

At Kisese II rockshelter, in Tanzania, an individual, dated between 7240 BP and 6985 BP, carried haplogroups B2b1a~ and L5b2.

At Luxmanda, Tanzania, an individual, estimated to date between 3141 BP and 2890 BP, carried haplogroup L2a1.

At Kuumbi Cave, in Zanzibar, Tanzania, an individual, estimated to date between 1370 BP and 1303 BP, carried haplogroup L4b2a2c.

Karatu District

At Gishimangeda Cave, in Karatu District, Tanzania, there were eleven pastoralists of the Pastoral Neolithic; one carried haplogroups E1b1b1a1b2/E-V22 and HV1b1, another carried haplogroup L0a, another carried haplogroup L3x1, another carried haplogroup L4b2a2b, another carried haplogroups E1b1b1b2b2a1/E-M293 and L3i2, another carried haplogroup L3h1a2a1, another carried haplogroups E1b1b1b2b2/E-V1486, likely E-M293 and L0f2a1, and another carried haplogroups E1b1b1b2b2/E-V1486, likely E-M293, and T2+150; while most of the haplogroups among three pastoralists went undetermined, one was determined to carry haplogroup BT, likely B.

Pemba Island

At Makangale Cave, on Pemba Island, Tanzania, an individual, estimated to date between 1421 BP and 1307 BP, carried haplogroup L0a.

At Makangale Cave, on Pemba Island, Tanzania, an individual, estimated to date between 639 BP and 544 BP, carried haplogroup L2a1a2.

Uganda

At Munsa, in Uganda, an individual, dated to the Later Iron Age (500 BP), carried haplogroup L3b1a1.

Y-Chromosomal DNA

As of 19,000 years ago, Africans, bearing haplogroup E1b1a-V38, likely traversed across the Sahara, from east to west.

Before the slave trade period, East Africans, who carried haplogroup E1b1a-M2, expanded into Arabia, resulting in various rates of inheritance throughout Arabia (e.g., 2.8% Qatar, 3.2% Yemen, 5.5% United Arab Emirates, 7.4% Oman).

Mitochondrial DNA

In 150,000 BP, Africans (e.g., Central Africans, East Africans) bearing haplogroup L1 diverged. In 130,000 BP, Africans bearing haplogroup L5 diverged in East Africa. Between 130,000 BP and 75,000 BP, behavioral modernity emerged among Southern Africans and long-term interactions between the regions of Southern Africa and Eastern Africa became established. Between 75,000 BP and 60,000 BP, Africans bearing haplogroup L3 emerged in East Africa and eventually migrated into and became present in modern West Africans, Central Africans, and non-Africans. Amid the Holocene, including the Holocene Climate Optimum in 8000 BP, Africans bearing haplogroup L2 spread within West Africa and Africans bearing haplogroup L3 spread within East Africa. As the largest migration since the Out of Africa migration, migration from Sub-Saharan Africa toward the North Africa occurred, by West Africans, Central Africans, and East Africans, resulting in migrations into Europe and Asia; consequently, Sub-Saharan African mitochondrial DNA was introduced into Europe and Asia. During the early period of the Holocene, 50% of Sub-Saharan African mitochondrial DNA was introduced into North Africa by West Africans and the other 50% was introduced by East Africans. During the modern period, a greater number of West Africans introduced Sub-Saharan African mitochondrial DNA into North Africa than East Africans. Between 15,000 BP and 7000 BP, 86% of Sub-Saharan African mitochondrial DNA was introduced into Southwest Asia by East Africans, largely in the region of Arabia, which constitute 50% of Sub-Saharan African mitochondrial DNA in modern Southwest Asia. In the modern period, 68% of Sub-Saharan African mitochondrial DNA was introduced by East Africans and 22% was introduced by West Africans, which constitutes 50% of Sub-Saharan African mitochondrial DNA in modern Southwest Asia.

Autosomal DNA

Across all areas of Madagascar, the average ancestry for the Malagasy people was found to be 4% West Eurasian, 37% Austronesian, and 59% Bantu.

Medical DNA

Southern Africa

Archaic Human DNA

While Denisovan and Neanderthal ancestry in non-Africans outside of Africa are more certain, archaic human ancestry in Africans is less certain and is too early to be established with certainty.

Ancient DNA

Three Later Stone Age hunter-gatherers carried ancient DNA similar to Khoisan-speaking hunter-gatherers. Prior to the Bantu migration into the region, as evidenced by ancient DNA from Botswana, East African herders migrated into Southern Africa. Out of four Iron Age Bantu agriculturalists of West African origin, two earlier agriculturalists carried ancient DNA similar to Tsonga and Venda peoples and the two later agriculturalists carried ancient DNA similar to Nguni people; this indicates that there were various movements of peoples in the overall Bantu migration, which resulted in increased interaction and admixing between Bantu-speaking peoples and Khoisan-speaking peoples.

Botswana

At Nqoma, in Botswana, an individual, dated to the Early Iron Age (900 BP), carried haplogroup L2a1f.

At Taukome, in Botswana, an individual, dated to the Early Iron Age (1100 BP), carried haplogroups E1b1a1 (E-M2, E-Z1123) and L0d3b1.

At Xaro, in Botswana, there were two individuals, dated to the Early Iron Age (1400 BP); one carried haplogroups E1b1a1a1c1a and L3e1a2, and another carried haplogroups E1b1b1b2b (E-M293, E-CTS10880) and L0k1a2.

Malawi

Fingira

At Fingira rockshelter, in Malawi, an individual, dated between 6179 BP and 2341 BP, carried haplogroups B2 and L0d1.

At Fingira, in Malawi, an individual, estimated to date between 6175 BP and 5913 BP, carried haplogroups BT and L0d1b2b.

At Fingira, in Malawi, an individual, estimated to date between 6177 BP and 5923 BP, carried haplogroups BT and L0d1c.

At Fingira, in Malawi, an individual, estimated to date between 2676 BP and 2330 BP, carried haplogroup L0f.

Chencherere

At Chencherere, in Malawi, an individual, estimated to date between 5400 BP and 4800 BP, carried haplogroup L0k2.

At Chencherere, in Malawi, an individual, estimated to date between 5293 BP and 4979 BP, carried haplogroup L0k1.

Hora

At Hora 1 rockshelter, in Malawi, an individual, dated between 16,897 BP and 15,827 BP, carried haplogroups B2b and L5b.

At Hora 1 rockshelter, in Malawi, an individual, dated between 16,424 BP and 14,029 BP, carried haplogroups B2b1a2~ and L0d3/L0d3b.

At Hora, in Malawi, an individual, estimated to date between 10,000 BP and 5000 BP, carried haplogroups BT and L0k2.

At Hora, in Malawi, an individual, estimated to date between 8173 BP and 7957 BP, carried haplogroup L0a2.

South Africa

At Doonside, in South Africa, an individual, estimated to date between 2296 BP and 1910 BP, carried haplogroup L0d2.

At Champagne Castle, in South Africa, an individual, estimated to date between 448 BP and 282 BP, carried haplogroup L0d2a1a.

At Eland Cave, in South Africa, an individual, estimated to date between 533 BP and 453 BP, carried haplogroup L3e3b1.

At Mfongosi, in South Africa, an individual, estimated to date between 448 BP and 308 BP, carried haplogroup L3e1b2.

At Newcastle, in South Africa, an individual, estimated to date between 508 BP and 327 BP, carried haplogroup L3e2b1a2.

At St. Helena, in South Africa, an individual, estimated to date between 2241 BP and 1965 BP, carried haplogroups A1b1b2a and L0d2c1.

At Faraoskop Rock Shelter, in South Africa, an individual, estimated to date between 2017 BP and 1748 BP, carried haplogroups A1b1b2a and L0d1b2b1b.

At Kasteelberg, in South Africa, an individual, estimated to date between 1282 BP and 1069 BP, carried haplogroup L0d1a1a.

At Vaalkrans Shelter, in South Africa, an individual, estimated to date to 200 BP, is predominantly related to Khoisan speakers, partly related (15% - 32%) to East Africans, and carried haplogroups L0d3b1.

Ballito Bay

At Ballito Bay, South Africa, an individual, estimated to date between 1986 BP and 1831 BP, carried haplogroups A1b1b2 and L0d2c1.

At Ballito Bay, South Africa, an individual, estimated to date between 2149 BP and 1932 BP, carried haplogroups A1b1b2 and L0d2a1.

Zambia
At Kalemba rockshelter, in Zambia, an individual, dated between 5285 BP and 4975 BP, carried haplogroup L0d1b2b.

Y-Chromosomal DNA

Various Y chromosome studies show that the San carry some of the most divergent (oldest) human Y-chromosome haplogroups. These haplogroups are specific sub-groups of haplogroups A and B, the two earliest branches on the human Y-chromosome tree.

Mitochondrial DNA

In 200,000 BP, Africans (e.g., Khoisan of Southern Africa) bearing haplogroup L0 diverged from other Africans bearing haplogroup L1′6, which tend to be northward of Southern Africa. Between 130,000 BP and 75,000 BP, behavioral modernity emerged among Southern Africans and long-term interactions between the regions of Southern Africa and Eastern Africa became established.

Mitochondrial DNA studies also provide evidence that the San carry high frequencies of the earliest haplogroup branches in the human mitochondrial DNA tree. This DNA is inherited only from one's mother. The most divergent (oldest) mitochondrial haplogroup, L0d, has been identified at its highest frequencies in the southern African San groups.

Autosomal DNA

In a study published in March 2011, Brenna Henn and colleagues found that the ǂKhomani San, as well as the Sandawe and Hadza peoples of Tanzania, were the most genetically diverse of any living humans studied. This high degree of genetic diversity hints at the origin of anatomically modern humans.

Medical DNA

Among the ancient DNA from three hunter-gatherers sharing genetic similarity with San people and four Iron Age agriculturalists, their SNPs indicated that they bore variants for resistance against sleeping sickness and Plasmodium vivax. In particular, two out of the four Iron Age agriculturalists bore variants for resistance against sleeping sickness and three out of the four Iron Age agriculturalists bore Duffy negative variants for resistance against malaria. In contrast to the Iron Age agriculturalists, from among the San-related hunter-gatherers, a six-year-old boy may have died from schistosomiasis. In Botswana, a man, who dates to 1400 BP, may have also carried the Duffy negative variant for resistance against malaria.

Recent African origin of modern humans

Between 500,000 BP and 300,000 BP, anatomically modern humans may have emerged in Africa. As Africans (e.g., Y-Chromosomal Adam, Mitochondrial Eve) have migrated from their places of origin in Africa to other locations in Africa, and as the time of divergence for East African, Central African, and West African lineages are similar to the time of divergence for the Southern African lineage, there is insufficient evidence to identify a specific region for the origin of humans in Africa. In 100,000 BP, anatomically modern humans migrated from Africa into Eurasia. Subsequently, tens of thousands of years after, the ancestors of all present-day Eurasians migrated from Africa into Eurasia and eventually became admixed with Denisovans and Neanderthals.

Archaeological and fossil evidence provide support for the African origin of homo sapiens and behavioral modernity. Models reflecting a pan-African origin (multiple locations of origin within Africa) and evolution of modern humans have been developed. As the idea of "modern" has become increasingly problematized, research has "begun to disentangle what is meant by "modern" genetic ancestry, skeletal morphology, and behavior, recognizing these are unlikely to form a single package."

See also

 Genetic history of the African diaspora

Notes

References

Genetic genealogy
History of Africa
Modern human genetic history